A List of churches in Orkney, Scotland:

The islands have an estimated 27 active churches for 21,500 inhabitants, a ratio of one church to every 796 people.

The islands were originally divided into 21 civil parishes: Birsay and Harray, Cross and Burness (on Sanday), Eday, Evie and Rendall, Firth, Holm, Hoy and Graemsay, Kirkwall and St Ola, Lady (on Sanday), Orphir, Papa Westray, Rousay and Egilsay, Sandwick, Shapinsay, South Ronaldsay, St Andrews and Deerness, Stenness, Stromness, Stronsay, South Walls & Flotta, and Westray.

Defunct churches

Citations

References
 Graham-Campbell, James and Batey, Colleen E. (1998) Vikings in Scotland: An Archaeological Survey. Edinburgh University Press. 
 Omand, Donald (ed.) (2003) The Orkney Book. Edinburgh. Birlinn.

Further reading

External links
 (contains photographs of several churches)

Churches in Orkney
Orkney